Dr. Bimala Rai Paudyal is a Nepalese politician. She served as the Minister of Foreign Affairs in the Government of Nepal during January- February 2023, becoming the third woman to hold this position. Paudyal also serves as a nominated Member of the National Assembly of the Federal Parliament of Nepal. She is affiliated with the Communist Party of Nepal (Unified Marxist–Leninist).

Paudyal holds a PhD in Development Studies from the International Institute of Social Studies in the Netherlands, an MA in Economics and Management of Rural Development, a Post Graduate Diploma in Development Administration from Manchester University in the UK, and a BSC in Agriculture Economics from Tribhuvan University in Nepal.

She is also an adjunct Professor of Development Studies at the Agriculture and Forestry University in Nepal. Before entering politics, Paudyal worked with government agencies, INGOs, bilateral organizations, and NGOs. She represented Nepal in Climate Parliament and the International Parliamentary Network for Education (IPNEd).

References

Living people
Foreign Ministers of Nepal
Women government ministers of Nepal
Female foreign ministers
21st-century Nepalese women politicians
21st-century Nepalese politicians
Communist Party of Nepal (Unified Marxist–Leninist) politicians
1966 births